In the mathematical theory of Kleinian groups, Jørgensen's inequality is an inequality involving the traces of elements of a Kleinian group, proved by .

The inequality states that if A and B generate a non-elementary discrete subgroup of the SL2(C), then 

The inequality gives a quantitative estimate of the discreteness of the group: many of the standard corollaries bound
elements of the group away from the identity. For instance, if A is parabolic,
then 

where  denotes the usual norm on SL2(C).

Another consequence in the parabolic case is the existence of cusp neighborhoods in hyperbolic 3-manifolds: if G is a
Kleinian group and j is a parabolic element of G with fixed point w, then there is a horoball based at w
which projects to a cusp neighborhood in the quotient space . Jørgensen's inequality
is used to prove that every element of G which does not have a fixed point at w moves the horoball entirely
off itself and so does not affect the local geometry of the quotient at w; intuitively, the geometry is entirely determined
by the parabolic element.

See also
The Margulis lemma is a qualitative generalisation to more general spaces of negative curvature.

References

Kleinian groups
Theorems in geometry
Inequalities